The women's 400 metres hurdles at the 2017 World Championships in Athletics was held at the London Olympic Stadium on  and 10 August.

Summary
Olympic champion Dalilah Muhammad (USA) duplicated her strategy by running aggressively from the start of the final, making up the stagger on Léa Sprunger (SUI) to her outside during the first turn and passing two-time defending champion Zuzana Hejnová (CZE) another lane over by the third hurdle. The closest to keep pace with Muhammad was Kori Carter (USA) almost unnoticed out in lane 9. By the time they arrived on the home stretch, Muhammad had a step on Carter, with Hejnová another two steps back. But Carter closed quickly, passing Muhammad before the final hurdle and running powerfully to the finish for the win. Also closing fast from two steps behind, Ristananna Tracey (JAM) caught Hejnová over the tenth hurdle and widened the gap for a clear bronze.

Records
Before the competition, the records were as follows:

No records were set at the competition.

Qualification standard
The standard to qualify automatically for entry was 56.10.

Schedule
The event schedule, in local time (UTC+1), is as follows:

Results

Heats
The first round took place on 7 August in five heats as follows:

The first four in each heat ( Q ) and the next four fastest ( q ) qualified for the semifinals. The overall results were as follows:

Semifinals
The semifinals took place on 8 August in three heats as follows:

The first two in each heat ( Q ) and the next two fastest ( q ) qualified for the final. The overall results were as follows:

Final
The final took place on 10 August at 21:38. The results were as follows (photo finish):

References

400
400 metres hurdles at the World Athletics Championships
Women's sport in London